Aydıntepe District is a district of Bayburt Province of Turkey. Its seat is the town Aydıntepe. Its area is 446 km2, and its population is 6,234 (2021).

Composition
There is one municipality in Aydıntepe District:
 Aydıntepe

There are 23 villages in Aydıntepe District:

 Akbulut
 Alaca
 Aşağıkırzı
 Başpınar
 Çatıksu
 Çayırköprü
 Çiğdemlik
 Dumlu
 Erikdibi
 Gümüşdamla
 Günbuldu
 İncili
 Kavlatan
 Kılıçkaya
 Pınargözü
 Şalcılar
 Sırataşlar
 Sorkunlu
 Suludere
 Yanoba
 Yapracık
 Yazlık
 Yukarıkırzı

References

Districts of Bayburt Province